Auranthine is an antimicrobial chemical compound isolated from a nephrotoxic strain of Penicillium fungus, Penicillium aurantiogriseum.

A total synthesis of auranthine has been reported.

References

Antibiotics
Lactams
Benzamides